Fiavé is a comune (municipality) in Trentino in the northern Italian region Trentino-Alto Adige/Südtirol, located about  southwest of Trento.

The municipality of Fiavè contains the frazioni (subdivisions, mainly villages and hamlets) of Ballino, Favrio and Stumiaga.

Fiavè borders the municipalities of Comano Terme, Bleggio Superiore, Ledro and Tenno.

Demographic evolution

World heritage site
It is the location of one or more prehistoric pile-dwellings (or stilt house) settlements that are part of the prehistoric pile dwellings around the Alps UNESCO World Heritage Site.

References

Cities and towns in Trentino-Alto Adige/Südtirol